Selo sanatoriya Alkino («Älkä» şifaxanahı) is a rural locality (a selo) in Alkinsky Selsoviet, Chishminsky District, Bashkortostan, Russia. The population was 432 as of 2010. There are 34 streets.

Geography 
Selo sanatoriya Alkino is located 27 km northeast of Chishmy (the district's administrative centre) by road. Novomikhaylovka is the nearest rural locality.

References 

Rural localities in Chishminsky District